Citizens Here and Abroad is an indie rock group from San Francisco, California, United States. They formed in 2002.

Band history
Citizens Here and Abroad was formed in 2002 when Adrienne Robillard and Dan Lowrie, following the breakup of their previous band Secadora, happened to move into an apartment across the street from Dealership drummer Chris Wetherell. Neighborly talking led to musical collaboration. Taking their name from a 1953 Girl Scout manual discovered on a bookshelf at a boozy Oakland house party, the trio cemented their lineup with Dealership bass player/vocalist Chris Groves.

Their sound has been described as dreamy and cerebral. While their songs are built on catchy melodies, they don't tend to follow traditional verse-chorus-verse song structure, opting for a more experimental approach to composition.

In 2004, their debut album, Ghosts of Tables and Chairs was released on Omnibus Records. The band toured the US and the UK in support of the album, and the track Appearances ended up being used in the U.S. television teen soap opera, The O.C.

Their follow-up album, Waving, Not Drowning (see Not Waving but Drowning) was released in 2006 on Turn Records.

Band members
 2002 to present - Chris Groves; vocals, bass, keyboards
 2002 to present - Dan Lowrie; guitar
 2002 to present - Adrienne Robillard; vocals, guitar
 2002 to present - Chris Wetherell; drums

Discography
Albums
Ghosts of Tables and Chairs (Omnibus, 2004)
Waving, Not Drowning (Turn Records, 2006)

Compilations
 Birds of a Feather (2004)
 Orange (Dreams by Degrees 2006)
 Silver Rocket 100 (Silver Rocket, 2007)

References

External links
 Turn Records
 Omnibus Records

Indie rock musical groups from California
Musical groups from San Francisco
Musical groups established in 2002
2002 establishments in California